This is a list of songs about Manila, set there, or named after a location or feature of the city.

Songs

 A Orillas del Pasig - José Rizal (1876)
 Agila ng Maynila - Freddie Aguilar (1988)
 Alabang Girls - Andrew E. (1992)
 Anak ng Pasig - Smokey Mountain (1990)
 Ang Huling El Bimbo - Eraserheads (1995)
 Awit ng Maynila - Antonio Villegas (1966)
 City of Hope - Journey (2011)
 ¿Donde vas con mantón de Manila? - Tomás Bretón (1894)
 Haligi ng Maynila - The Jerks (1997)
 Hari ng Tondo - Gloc-9 ft. Denise Barbacena (2011)
 Isang Probinsyano sa Maynila - Ebe Dancel (2011)
 Kalesa - Sylvia La Torre (1959)
 La Flor de Manila - Dolores Paterno (1879)
 Limang Dipang Tao - Lea Salonga (1994)
 Mahal Kong Maynila - Kakai Bautista and Vince De Jesus (2002)
 Man From Manila - Francis Magalona (1991)
 Manila - Amber Rowley (2006)
 Manila - Hotdog (1973)
 Manila - Sandwich (2008)
 Manila - Seelenluft (2002)
 Manila Anthem - Jump Smokers ft. Audiobot (2013)
 Manila, Manila, Manila - Los Panchos (1958)
 Manila Girl - Put3ska (1995)
 Manila Street - Amy Speace (2011)
 Manila Teenage Death Squad - Chicosci (2006)
 Maynila - Introvoys (1989)
 Maynila - Loonie (2010)
 Maynila - Noel Cabangon (2015)
 Modelong Charing - Blakdyak (1997)
 Mutya ng Pasig - Nicanor Abelardo (1926)
 My Backyard (The Moon Over Manila) - Catfish (1988)
 Nasusunog ang Maynila - Radioactive Sago Project (2007)
 Pamaypay ng Maynila - Sylvia La Torre (1954)
 Pasko sa Maynila - Ariel Rivera (1996)
 Probinsyana - Bamboo (2007)
 ¿Qué hago en Manila? - Virus (1983)
 Shopping - Ryan Bang ft. Donnalyn Bartolome (2015)
 Swerte-Swerte Lang - Joel P. Navarro (1978)
 The Belle of Manila - Louise Haack McLay (1898)
 The Tribute to Manila - Love Like Blood (1989)
 Thrilla in Manila - Greyson Chance (2014)
 eine nacht in manila - Bilderbuch (2018)

See also
 Manila Sound

References

Manila
Music of Metro Manila
Culture in Manila
Songs about Manila